Loni von Friedl (born 1943) is an Austrian film and television actress. She began as a child actress in the early 1950s, before graduating to mature roles during the following decade. The daughter of cinematographer Fritz von Friedl, she also has an actor brother of the same name. Her nephew is actor Christoph von Friedl.

She was married to actor Götz George from 1966 to 1976. She later married Jürgen Schmidt.

Selected filmography 
 Maria Theresa (1951), as Marie Antoinette (child)
 The Merry Farmer (1951), as Annamirl (child)
 When the Bells Sound Clearly (1959), as Hanna
 My Schoolfriend (1960), as Rosi
  (1961), as Katja
 The Shadows Grow Longer (1961), as Erika Schöner
 Two Among Millions (1961), as Christine
 The Happy Years of the Thorwalds (1962), as Brigitte von Tienitz
 Love Has to Be Learned (1963), as Margot Zimmermann
 The Spendthrift (1964), as Amalie
  (1964), as Vickie Paul
 The Blue Max (1966), as Elfi Heidemann
 The Blood of Fu Manchu (1968), as Celeste
 The Moment to Kill (1968), as Regina Forrester
 Doppelgänger (1969), as Lise Hartman
 Diamantendetektiv Dick Donald (1971, TV series), as Daisy Johnson
  (1983, TV film), as Ilona
  (1984, TV film), as Martina Hillenbrink
 Ein Heim für Tiere (1985–1987, TV series), as Dr. Ingrid Probst
 Teufels Großmutter (1986, TV series), as Hetty Engelhardt
 Waldhaus (1987–1988, TV series), as Ilse Kurawski
 Peter und Paul (1994–1998, TV series), as Baroness von Rabenberg

References

Bibliography 
 Bock, Hans-Michael & Bergfelder, Tim. The Concise CineGraph. Encyclopedia of German Cinema. Berghahn Books, 2009.

External links 
 

1943 births
Living people
Austrian film actresses
Austrian television actresses
20th-century Austrian actresses
21st-century Austrian actresses
Actresses from Vienna